Broto (in Medieval Aragonese: Brotto) is a municipality in the province of Huesca, Aragon, Spain. According to the 2018 census (INE), the municipality has a population of 531 inhabitants.

Villages
The Valle de Broto includes the following villages:
Broto proper (905 m) in the center of the valley
Oto (913 m), 1 km south of Broto
Buesa (1135 m), 3 km south of Broto on the eastern slope of the valley
Sarvisé (863 m), 3 km south of Broto
Asín de Broto (1103 m), 13 km south of Broto, 4 km north of Fiscal
Bergua (1030 m), 3 km west of Asin, now deserted
Ayerbe de Broto, now deserted
Yosa, now deserted
Escartin, now deserted
Torla (1032 m)
Fragen (1113 m)
Viu de Linás (1243 m)
Linás de Broto (1456 m)

References

External links

Municipalities in the Province of Huesca